Douglas Allen Anderson (born December 30, 1959) is an American writer and editor on the subjects of fantasy and medieval literature, specializing in textual analysis of the works of J. R. R. Tolkien. He is a winner of the Mythopoeic Award for scholarship.

Early life 

Douglas Anderson was born in Valparaiso, Indiana, United States. His first published book was The Annotated Hobbit (1988), which grew out of a study of J. R. R. Tolkien's revisions to the various editions of The Hobbit following the publication of The Lord of the Rings. The book consisted of Anderson's detailed explanations alongside Tolkien's text. A revised and illustrated edition was published in 2002.

Career 

Anderson's textual studies of The Lord of the Rings are the core of the Houghton Mifflin revised American edition of 1987, incorporating various changes made to British editions at Tolkien's direction.  He contributed a "Note on the Text" discussing the history of these changes, which was subsequently incorporated into later editions with various minor revisions.

With Verlyn Flieger and Michael D. C. Drout, he is a founding editor of Tolkien Studies: An Annual Scholarly Review; the first volume appeared in 2004.

Anderson has edited modern editions of works by fantasy authors including Leonard Cline, Kenneth Morris, Evangeline Walton and William Hope Hodgson. 
He is a visiting lecturer at Signum University.
Aside from his editing and Tolkien studies, he is a bookseller, having worked first in Ithaca, New York, and then in Indiana. He runs the publishing business Nodens Books, which seeks to revive the work of forgotten authors.

Awards and distinctions 

The Annotated Hobbit won the 1990 Mythopoeic Award for scholarship.

Books 

 Written

 J.R.R. Tolkien: A Descriptive Bibliography (Winchester Bibliographies of 20th Century Writers) (with Wayne G. Hammond), St. Paul's Bibliographies, 1993
 Tales Before Tolkien: The Roots of Modern Fantasy, Ballantine Books, 2003
 J.R.R. Tolkien: Interviews, Reminiscences, and Other Essays, Houghton Mifflin, 2007 
 Tales Before Narnia: The Roots of Modern Fantasy and Science Fiction, Del Ray, 2008, 

 Edited

 The Annotated Hobbit, Houghton Mifflin, 1988, revised 2002
 The Chalchiuhite Dragon by Kenneth Morris, Tom Doherty Associates, 1992
 The Lady of Frozen Death and Other Weird Tales by Leonard Cline, Necronomicon Press, 1992
 The Dragon Path: Collected Tales of Kenneth Morris, TOR, 1995
 The Marvellous Land of Snergs by E. A. Wyke-Smith, HarperCollins, 1995
 The Life of Sir Aglovale de Galis, Theclassics Us, 2000
 Eyes of the God: The Weird Fiction and Poetry of R. H. Barlow,  Hippocampus Press, 2002
 Book of The Three Dragons by Kenneth Morris, Cold Spring Press, 2004
 Tolkien Studies: An Annual Scholarly Review, Volume 1, 2004 (co-editor), West Virginia University Press, 
 H.P. Lovecraft's Favorite Weird Tales: The Roots of Modern Horror, Cold Spring Press, 2005
 Adrift on The Haunted Seas: The Best Short Stories of William Hope Hodgson, 2005
 Tolkien Studies: An Annual Scholarly Review, Volume 2, 2005 (co-editor), West Virginia University Press, 
 The Dark Chamber by Leonard Cline, Cold Spring Press, 2005
 Seekers of Dreams: Masterpieces of Fantasy, Simon & Schuster, 2005
 Tolkien Studies: An Annual Scholarly Review, Volume 3, 2006 (co-editor), West Virginia University Press, 
 Tolkien Studies: An Annual Scholarly Review, Volume 4, 2007 (co-editor), West Virginia University Press,

References

Sources 

 Anderson, Douglas A (editor): The Annotated Hobbit (revised edition), 2002, 
 Mythprint, June 1999

External links 

 
 

Living people
1959 births
People from Valparaiso, Indiana
American writers
Tolkien Society members
Tolkien studies
Weird fiction writers